Gable Lake is a small lake located in Navarre, Florida. The lake is primarily fed by a number of small unnamed creeks on the south shore. Subsequently, the lake outflows into the East Bay River and the East Bay via a small unnamed stream. Due to the former lack of a GNIS entry on the body of water, the name of the lake was not official until a recent ruling by the United States Board on Geographic Names. 

Gable Lake is presumed to be named after John Everett Gable and Katherine Gable, who lived in the area during the 1980s and 90s.

See also 
 Arachno Creek
 East Bay
 East Bay River
 Navarre, Florida
 William's Creek

References 

Navarre, Florida
Bodies of water of Santa Rosa County, Florida
Lakes of Florida